Chris Alajajian (born 31 October 1986) is an Australian-Armenian race car driver.

Early career
In 2004 he won the Australian Production Car Championship, becoming the youngest ever driver to win an Australian championship. In the same year he also contested some rounds of the Australian Formula 3 Championship with Piccola Scuderia and raced in the Australian GT Performance Car Championship.

Continuing in Australian Formula 3 in 2005, Alajajian started the year with Astuti Competition, before moving to Protecnica Racing. He finished third in the championship. Chris also won a number of races in the Australian Performance Car Championship with Protecnica Racing.

V8 Supercars
Alajajian moved to the Fujitsu V8 Supercar Series for 2006. At Bathurst on Friday 6 October 2006 Alajajian was involved in an accident that resulted in the death of New Zealand racing driver Mark Porter. Porter's car spun in a section at the top of the mountain and was hit from behind by Alajajian and stalled, sitting sideways on the track. As fellow driver David Clark came around a blind corner he swerved to try and avoid Porter's car but slid sideways into the drivers door. Porter was airlifted to hospital with serious head and chest injuries but died in late afternoon of Sunday 8 October as the feature race was concluding. The incident was completely unavoidable as it occurred in a section of track that is blind to following drivers.

He continued in the Fujitsu V8 Supercar Series 2007 and made a one-off appearance in 2009 and 2013.

A1 Grand Prix
First Test: In August 2007, Alajajian flew to the Snetterton Motor Racing Circuit in Great Britain to test for A1 Team Lebanon in the A1 Grand Prix series, before jetting back into Sydney in time for the fifth round of the Fujitsu V8s at Oran Park Raceway, west of Sydney.

The test in the 550 hp A1GP car was recognition of Alajajian's prowess behind the wheel of open-wheeled cars, finishing as high as second in the opening round of the 2007 Australian Formula 3 Championship – run in conjunction with the Australian round of the 2006–07 A1GP at Eastern Creek in February 2007.

Racing: Chris made his debut in the series at the Dutch round in the 2007–08 season. After missing round 2 in Brno, he raced the next 4 rounds, being in a points scoring position in New Zealand before being hit from behind, and was 2nd quickest in Rookie Qualifying at Eastern Creek.

Mini Challenge
Alajajian moved to the Australian Mini Challenge later in 2009 where he finished second in the championship. His prize for that will be a trip to Spain with series champion Paul Stokell to represent Australia in the Mini Challenge World Finals in early 2010. In 2010 he won the Australian Championship.

Career results

(1) = Contested concurrently with the Australian Formula 3 Championship
(2) = Team standings.

Complete V8 Development Series results

(key) (Races in bold indicate pole position) (Races in italics indicate fastest lap)

† Not Eligible for points

Complete A1 Grand Prix results
(key) (Races in bold indicate pole position) (Races in italics indicate fastest lap)

References

External links 
 
 Driver DataBase profile
 Racing Reference profile
 News articles, pictures & videos at Motorsport.com
 V8 Supercars – Chris Alajajian's win at Wakefield Park Raceway (released 1 April 2007)

1986 births
A1 Team Lebanon drivers
Australian Formula 3 Championship drivers
Australian people of Armenian descent
Living people
Racing drivers from Sydney
Sportsmen from New South Wales
Supercars Championship drivers